Jane Stewart Smith (–1925) was a Scottish painter and draughtswoman, based in Edinburgh.

Art 
Jane Stewart Smith possessed a talent for architectural studies. She produced scenes of street life, building studies, and landscapes, in oils and watercolours. She also produced drawings.

She exhibited for over twenty years, including at the Royal Scottish Academy (49 pictures, 1865–87), the Royal Glasgow Institute (1866–82), the Royal Hibernian Academy (1869), and the Society of Women Artists (37 pictures, 1869–87).

Her exhibited works included: Melrose Abbey, Ancient Houses, Edinburgh, Canal Scene, Chester, and Bit of Leith Harbour.

Writing 
She was also the author of two books:

 The Grange of St Giles. Edinburgh: T. & A. Constable, 1898;
 Historic Stones of Bygone Edinburgh. Edinburgh: T. & A. Constable, 1924.

References

Citations

Bibliography 

 Gray, Sara (2009). "Smith, Jane Stewart". In The Dictionary of British Women Artists. The Lutterworth Press. .
 Harris, Paul & Halsby, Julian (1990). The Dictionary of Scottish Painters: 1600 to the Present. Canongate. .
 McEwan, Peter J. M. (1994). The Dictionary of Scottish Art and Architecture. Antique Collectors' Club. .
 "Jane Stewart Smith, artist and writer". Edinburgh Footnotes. 22 November 2015. Retrieved 15 April 2022.
 "Jane Stewart Smith watercolours". Tales of One City. 5 November 2021. Retrieved 15 April 2022.
 "Smith, Jane Stewart". Capital Collections. n.d. Retrieved 15 April 2022.

1839 births
1925 deaths
19th-century Scottish women artists
19th-century Scottish women writers
20th-century Scottish women artists
20th-century Scottish women writers